Afshan is a 1981 Pakistani television series written by Fatima Surayya Bajia based on the novel Afshan which was written by A.R Khatoon and directed by Qasim Jalali.

Synopsis 
The story is about a large family in which the elders decide the fate of their children and the honor of their family is considered above all else even then their children's happiness.

Cast 
 Shakeel as Ali
 Ayesha Khan as Husna
 Zainab Umar as Afsha
 Tahira Wasti as Sehar
 Qazi Wajid as Ahmed (Naseera's husband)
 Shafi Muhammad Shah as Mohsin
 Begum Khurshid Mirza as Almira
 Ishrat Hashmi as Naseera
 Arsh Muneer as Chachi Jan
 Rizwan Wasti as Abid
 Azra Sherwani as Roshan Begum
 Tasneem Rana as Bunyadi Aunty

Production

Casting 
It was the third time it reunited Fatima Surayya Bajia and Begum Khurshid Mirza as she had previously done two of her dramas Shama and Aagahi.

Awards and nominations

References

External links
 

1980s Pakistani television series
Pakistani television dramas based on novels
Pakistan Television Corporation original programming
Pakistani drama television series
Pakistani family television dramas
PTV Award winners
Urdu-language television shows